Sun Manji (3 August 1931 – 22 February 2023) was a Chinese biochemical pharmacologist who was a researcher at the Academy of Military Medical Sciences, and an academician of the Chinese Academy of Sciences.

He was a delegate to the 8th National People's Congress. He was a member of the 8th and 9th National Committee of the Chinese People's Political Consultative Conference.

Biography
Sun was born in Kaifeng, Henan, on 3 August 1931, while his ancestral home in Anyang. In 1948, he was accepted to the School of Medicine, National Central University, which was reshuffled as the Air Force Medical University in 1954. After university, he was assigned to the Institute of Toxicology and Drugs, Academy of Military Medical Sciences, where he engaged in long-term research on the biochemical mechanism of chemical warfare agent poisoning and prevention.

Sun was a visiting scholar at the University of London from 1973 to 1975 and a visiting professor of the Technical University of Berlin from 1987 to 1988.

Sun died at the 301 Hospital, in Beijing, on 22 February 2023, at the age of 91.

Honours and awards
 1986 State Science and Technology Progress Award (Special) for the research on medical protection of special weapon injuries in wartime
 1987 State Natural Science Award (Second Class) for the research on biochemical mechanism of the interaction between soman and acetylcholinesterase
 November 1991 Member of the Chinese Academy of Sciences (CAS)

References

1931 births
2023 deaths
People from Kaifeng
Scientists from Henan
Air Force Medical University alumni
Members of the Chinese Academy of Sciences
20th-century Chinese scientists
21st-century Chinese scientists
Delegates to the 8th National People's Congress
Members of the 8th Chinese People's Political Consultative Conference
Members of the 9th Chinese People's Political Consultative Conference